Duxbury Bay is a bay on the coast of Massachusetts in the United States. The west shore of the bay is the town of Duxbury, Massachusetts; and the bay is formed by a sandbar called The Gurnet extending southeasterly from Marshfield, Massachusetts into Cape Cod Bay. The town of Marshfield was named for the estuarine wetland at the north end of the bay. The bay opens southerly toward Plymouth, Massachusetts between Captains Hill to the west and Saquish Head to the east.

Navigation

The bay is approximately three miles long from north to south with an average width of two miles. The bottom is mostly shallow sand and mud flats exposed at low water with a few winding channels. There is  clearance under a  fixed span in the Powder Point Bridge to access the northern end of the bay.

In 1908 The United States Army Corps of Engineers dredged a  channel to the Duxbury wharves.

Namesake
The United States Navy seaplane tender USS Duxbury Bay, in commission from 1944 to 1966, was named for Duxbury Bay.

Notes

References
 (See ship namesake paragraph.)

Bays of Massachusetts
Bays of Plymouth County, Massachusetts